The 2022 Okinawa gubernatorial election was held on 11 September 2022 to elect the next governor of Okinawa. In the election, incumbent Governor Denny Tamaki who was backed by the Constitutional Democratic Party of Japan and some smaller parties ran against Atsushi Sakima who was supported by the Liberal Democratic Party and Komeito. Mikio Shimoji ran against both candidates as a third option. The potential relocation of the Naval Base Okinawa was, again, an important topic in the debate. Over 70% of voters in Okinawa opposed the relocation in the 2019 Okinawan referendum. Tamaki supported the complete removal of the base, while Sakima supported relocating it. Denny Tamaki won with 51.7% of the vote against Sakima and Mikio Shimoji.

Candidates

Running 
Denny Tamaki, incumbent Governor of Okinawa (2018–). (nominated by CDP, JCP, Reiwa Shinsengumi, SDP, and OSMP)
Atsushi Sakima, mayor of Ginowan (2012–2018) and candidate for Governor in 2018 Okinawa gubernatorial election. (nominated by LDP and Komeito)
Mikio Shimoji, former Minister of State for Disaster Management (2012) and Member of the House of Representatives (2014–)

Results

References 

2022 elections in Japan